Bispingen is a municipality in the Heidekreis district of Lower Saxony, Germany. It is a popular tourist destination with several holiday/theme parks. Its territory also includes the nature preserve of the Lüneburg Heath around the Wilseder Berg.

Geography

Location
Bispingen lies near interchange 43 of the A 7 motorway.

Subdivisions
Bispingen
Hützel
Steinbeck an der Luhe (Steinbeck/Luhe)
Behringen
Volkwardingen
Hörpel
Borstel
Haverbeck (Nieder- and Oberhaverbeck)
Wilsede, heath village at the foot of the Wilseder Berg; population: ~35

Neighbouring villages and towns
Schneverdingen
Undeloh
Egestorf
Soderstorf
Rehlingen
Munster
Soltau

Economy
Bispingen is popular with tourists as a local recreation area and nature reserve.

Places of interest
 Wilseder Berg, the highest hill on the Lüneburg Heath
 Dat ole Huus, a Low German house in Wilsede, one of the oldest open-air museums in Germany; built c. 1540, renovated 1742, moved to Wilsede 1907
 , a landscape garden with hunting lodge and Montagnetto model castle
 Burial ground in Volkwardingen with Bronze Age tumuli
  ("Old Church") dating to 1353, made from boulders; used for baptisms, weddings and other services as well as concerts
 Treppenspeicher in Volkwardingen, one of the oldest of this type of storage barn in the Lüneburg Heath, built in 1600 and 1702, restored in 2001
 Kart Centre, owned by racing driver Ralf Schumacher
 SnowDome Bispingen provides indoor skiing and snowboarding. It opened in autumn 2006
 Bispinger Heide holiday park, part of the Center Parcs chain

Notable people
 , founder of the firm, Grube KG Forstgerätestelle, which makes forestry equipment.

Gallery

References

Further reading
 Heinrich Schulz: Chronik von Wilsede, Stuttgart, 1967

External links

 
  

Heidmark
Lüneburg Heath